Mariano Moreno (Neuquén) is a village and municipality in Neuquén Province in southwestern Argentina.

References

Populated places in Neuquén Province